Nguyễn Thị Xuyến (born 6 September 1987) is a Vietnamese women's international footballer who plays as a defender. She is a member of the Vietnam women's national football team. She was part of the team at the 2014 AFC Women's Asian Cup.

International goals

References

External links 
 

1987 births
Living people
Women's association football defenders
Vietnamese women's footballers
Vietnam women's international footballers
Asian Games competitors for Vietnam
Footballers at the 2014 Asian Games
Southeast Asian Games gold medalists for Vietnam
Southeast Asian Games medalists in football
Competitors at the 2017 Southeast Asian Games
Competitors at the 2019 Southeast Asian Games
Southeast Asian Games silver medalists for Vietnam
Competitors at the 2013 Southeast Asian Games
21st-century Vietnamese women